John Newman is an American sculptor. He was born in Flushing, Queens in 1952. He received his B.A. from Oberlin College (1973). He attended the Whitney Museum Independent Study Program in 1972 and received his M.F.A. in 1975 from the Yale School of Art. He was a fellow at the Center for Advanced Visual Studies at MIT from 1975 to 1978. He is based in New York City.

Career 

Newman came of age as a sculptor in the late 1970s and early 1980s. He has had over 50 solo exhibitions and participated in numerous group exhibitions in galleries and museums throughout the United States, Europe, and Asia. His sculptures, drawings, and prints are represented in numerous public collections, including the Museum of Modern Art, New York, the Metropolitan Museum of Art, New York, the Whitney Museum of American Art, New York, the Tate Modern in London, the National Gallery of Australia, Canberra, and the Albertina in Vienna, and the Storm King Art Center, New York, among many others.
 
Newman is the recipient of many awards and residencies, including the Rome Prize, the Civitella Ranieri Foundation, the Guggenheim Foundation, the Joan Mitchell Foundation, the Pollock-Krasner Foundation, and a Senior Research Fulbright Grant to India. In 2015, he completed a residency at the Chinati Foundation in Marfa, Texas.
 
Newman is the former director of graduate studies in sculpture at the Yale School of Art. He currently teaches at the New York Studio School of Drawing, Painting and Sculpture and the School of Visual Arts in New York City. He has been commissioned to do several large-scale sculptures for the City of Richmond, Virginia, Dai Nippon in Tokyo, Storm King Art Center, and Grounds for Sculpture in Hamilton, New Jersey.

In print 

In his interview with Newman, which was published in the April 2012 issue of The Brooklyn Rail, its co-founder Phong Bui addressed his use of different materials and techniques, including Calcutta basket weaving, Bengali brass casting, and hariko techniques, to mix them up with practices from the West. In response, Newman said:

"I want to be very careful not to be a cultural tourist! I’m the filter of all of those experiences, which only occurs after I am back in the studio. [...] traveling allowed me to step out of the concealed contradictions that are embedded within a system; in this case the system is the art world, where so many of my contemporaries were making art about art, or how art connects to larger spheres of contexts, meaning the gallery space, the gallery system, or art’s possible social relevancy..."

In his Selected Writings, the artist Carroll Dunham notes about Newman's work:

"Newman’s mature work has evolved in methodical opposition to these commandments. It is intimate, materially omnivorous, hyper-spatially curvy, dissonantly evocative, eccentrically constructed, and defiantly connected to a notion of sculpture as abstract statuary, a three-dimensional site of anthropomorphized contemplation (the sort of art Ad Reinhardt described as “something you back into when you’re looking at a painting”)."

Solo exhibitions 

Newman has exhibited his work since 1977. His earliest national shows were hosted by the CUNY Graduate Center Mall, New York and the Center for Advanced Visual Studies, MIT, Cambridge, Massachusetts.

In 2016, the Beeler Gallery at Columbus College of Art and Design, in Columbus, Ohio, hosted “Possible in Principle.” In 2013, the Jaffe-Friede Gallery at Dartmouth College in Hanover, New Hampshire hosted “Everything is on the Table.” Newman's exhibition “Instruments of Argument” was hosted by the New York Studio School Gallery in 2009 and in 2007, the Sarah Moody Gallery of Art at the University of Alabama, Tuscaloosa, presented an exhibition as well. In 2005, his exhibition entitled "Monkey Wrenches and Household Saints" was shown at the Clifford Gallery at Colgate University (catalogue). In addition, he exhibited at Amherst College, Amherst, Massachusetts (1999), Grounds for Sculpture, Johnson Atelier, Mercerville, New Jersey (1998), Tyler Graphics, Mt. Kisco, New York (catalogue) (1995), Ft. Wayne Museum of Art, Ft. Wayne, Indiana (1993); Arkansas Art Center, Little Rock (catalogue)(1993), Reed College, Portland, Oregon (1981), and many others.

Statement 

In 2013, Newman stated: "People often misunderstand my work as surreal, because they see these disparate things. And because it’s not seemingly geometric or representational, it’s something that is not easily categorizable.”

Works in public collections 

 Addison Gallery of American Art, Andover, Massachusetts
 Akron Art Museum, Akron, Ohio
 Allen Art Museum, Oberlin College, Oberlin, Ohio
 The Albertina Museum, Vienna, Austria 
 Albright-Knox Art Gallery
 Arkansas Art Center
 Art Institute of Chicago
 Bank of Boston
 Belger Family Foundation, Kansas City, MO
 Boca Raton Art Museum
 The Brooklyn Museum
 Chase Manhattan Bank
 Chemical Bank
 Colby College Museum, Maine
 Dallas Museum of Art 
 Dannheiser Foundation
 Department of Transportation, Washington, DC 
 Deutsche Bank
 Des Moines Art Center
 Farnsworth Museum of Art, Maine
 Fidelity Investments
 First Bank System, Inc., Minneapolis
 The Fogg Art Museum 
 Fort Wayne Museum 
 General Mills Corporation
 Grand Rapids Museum
 High Museum
 Honolulu Museum of Art
 Hood Museum, Dartmouth College
 Joslyn Museum, Omaha, NE
 Library of Congress, DC
 List Center for the Visual Arts, MIT
 Los Angeles County Museum of Art
 McNay Art Museum, San Antonio, TX
 Mellon Bank, Pittsburgh, Pennsylvania
 Metropolitan Museum of Art 
 Minneapolis Institute of Arts 
 Mississippi Museum
 Sarah Moody Gallery of Art, University of Alabama, Tuscaloosa
 The Morgan Library
 Museum of Fine Arts, Boston
 Museum of Fine Arts, Houston
 Museum of Modern Art 
 The Nasher Collection, Dallas
 The Nasher Museum of Art at Duke University
 National Academy Museum
 National Gallery of Berlin
 National Gallery of Australia, Canberra 
 Nelson Atkins Museum
 New York Public Library
 Orlando Museum of Art
 Parrish Museum
 Palm Springs Art Museum
 Philadelphia Museum
 Portland Museum of Art, Maine
 Prudential Insurance
 Sammlung Hoffman, Berlin
 Sheldon Memorial Art Gallery, Lincoln, NE
 Staatliche Graphische Sammlung, Munich
 St. Louis Art Museum
 Storm King Art Center
 Southwestern Bell
 Tang Museum, Sarasota Springs, NY
 Tate Gallery, London
 University of Colorado/Boulder Art Museum
 Walker Art Center 
 Whitney Museum of American Art 
 Worcester Art Museum 
 Yale Art Gallery

Bibliography 

2020
   
Sarah Bahr, Ensnared by the Fine Art of Scam”, NY Times, Oct. 12t

2016
    
Will Heinrich, “Art in Review: John Newman and Jo Nigoghossian,” NY Times, Nov. 18th

Carroll Dunham,  “Into words: the collected writings of Carroll Dunham: John Newman”,  Badlands Unlimited

Anderson Turner, “Intersections at Akron Art Museum will expand your horizons,” Akron Beacon Journal,  October, 14th

2014
  
R.C. Baker, “The New Surreal”, Village Voice, May 14–20, Vol. LIX, No. 20

Peter Frank, “Get your Quick and Dirty Arts Education Haiku”, Huffington Post, September 5

2013
  
Ken Johnson,  “ Going Solo Has Its Day, in a Hodgepodge Style”, New York Times, March 8

2012

“John Newman and B. Wurtz”, BOMB, No. 120, Summer 2012

“In conversation: John Newman with Phong Bui”, The Brooklyn Rail, April

Peter Plagens, “Balancing Grit with Wit”, Wall St. Journal, March 17-18th

2009

Roberta Smith, “John Newman”’ New York Times, February 27th

Stephen Mueller, “John Newman: New York Studio School”, Art in America, May

Ben La Rocco, “John Newman”, The Brooklyn Rail, March

Stephanie Buhmann, “Exploratory Territories”, The Villager, Volume 78, Number 37 February 18–24

2006
   
Roberta Smith, "Critic's Notebook: Chelsea Is a battlefield: Galleries Muster Groups”, New York Times, July 28

David Cateforis, "John Newman at the Byron C. Cohen Gallery", REVIEW, December 2006

Ken Johnson, "From carved creatures to Disneyland rugs", Boston Globe, September 26

Stephanie Buhmann, "Review", Sculpture Magazine, April 2006, Vol. 25, No.3

2005

Laurie Simmons, "Artists on Artists". BOMB, Summer 2005, Number 92

Linda Yablonsky, "Why Small Sculpture is Big", Artnews, December

2003

Roberta Smith, "John Newman", New York Times, Friday, May 30"
Sandra Wolfer, "Sculptures find niche at seniors' home", Daily news, July 3
Roy Proctor, “Look up in the sky!”, Richmond Times Dispatch, Nov. 14th
Paulette Roberts-Pullen, “Art around us”, Style Weekly, Richmond, Virginia, Nov. 26th

2001

Janet Koplos, "John Newman at Von Lintel and Nusser", Art in America, November

Grace Glueck, "John Newman: Homespun", New York Times, Friday, May 18

Linda Yablonsky, "John Newman: Homespun", TimeOut, May 3–10, 2001

Mario Naves, "Creepy Fetishes, Lazy Eyes, Bad Boys in the West 20's", New York Observer

Daniel Rothbart,"The Protean Forms of John Newman",  NY Arts, April, Vol. 6, No. 4

Edith Newhall, "Talent-Material Culture", New York Magazine, May 7, 2001,

Will Jones, "Station's sculpture stirs up a buzz", Richmond Times-Dispatch, Nov. 22

H. Peter Stern and others, "Earth, Sky and Sculpture: Storm King Art Center"

Raphael Rubinstein, "A Stealth Revolution in Sculpture: John Newman", catalogue essay for GrandArts exhibition

Nancy Princenthal, " Homespun", catalogue essay for Edition Von Lintel and Nusser

Robin Trafton, ""C" is for Contrast", Kansas City Star, Dec. 7th, 2001

Janet Purcell, "Grounds for Celebration", Trenton Times, June 14

References

External links 

 John Newman
 John Newman, Nov 2012

1952 births
Artists from New York City
Living people
Sculptors from New York (state)